The 2016–17 UTSA Roadrunners women's basketball team represents the University of Texas at San Antonio during the 2016–17 NCAA Division I women's basketball season.

The Roadrunners, led by fourth year head coach Lubomyr Lichonczak, play their home games at the Convocation Center and were fourth year members of Conference USA. They finished the season 14–17, 10–8 in C-USA play to finish in seventh place. They lost in the first round of the C-USA women's tournament to Rice.

Roster

Schedule

|-
!colspan=9 style="background:#E74F00; color:#00438C;"| Exhibition

|-
!colspan=9 style="background:#E74F00; color:#00438C;"| Non-conference regular season

|-
!colspan=9 style="background:#E74F00; color:#00438C;"| Conference USA regular season

|-
!colspan=9 style="background:#E74F00; color:#00438C;"| C-USA Women's Tournament

See also
2016–17 UTSA Roadrunners men's basketball team

References

UTSA Roadrunners women's basketball seasons
UTSA Roadrunners
UTSA Roadrunners
UTSA Roadrunners